Neocatapyrenium is a genus of squamulose lichens in the family Verrucariaceae. It has five species. The genus was circumscribed by Hiroshi Harada in 1993, with Neocatapyrenium cladonioideum assigned as the type species.

Species
Neocatapyrenium cladonioideum 
Neocatapyrenium disparatum 
Neocatapyrenium latzelii 
Neocatapyrenium radicescens 
Neocatapyrenium rhizinosum

References

Verrucariales
Eurotiomycetes genera
Lichen genera
Taxa described in 1993